The  Las Vegas Locomotives season was the fourth season for the United Football League franchise.

Venue
For 2012, the Locomotives opened negotiations with both Sam Boyd Stadium, the team's home for its entire existence to date, and Cashman Field, a smaller baseball venue within the Las Vegas city limits.  In the end, the Locos management elected to remain at Sam Boyd for the first two games of the season; the league suspended operations before the other two games could be played.

Broadcasting
All 2012 Las Vegas Locomotives games (along with all other 2012 UFL games) were broadcast live nationally on CBS Sports Network. Unlike 2010 and 2011, there was no radio or Internet broadcast.

Personnel
Head coach Jim Fassel returned for his fourth season with the Locomotives, which makes him the longest-tenured coach in UFL history; all three of the other original UFL coaches have since left the league.

Staff

Roster

Schedule
All games were broadcast nationally on CBS Sports Network.

Standings

References

Las Vegas Locomotives seasons
Las Vegas Locomotives
Las Vegas Locomotives